Taupō Bay is a bay, village and rural community in the Far North District and Northland Region of New Zealand's North Island. There are about 40 permanent residents, and 180 properties. The white sand beach is 1.5 km wide.

The Taupō Marae is a meeting place for the Ngāpuhi / Ngāti Kahu ki Whaingaroa hapū of Ngatirua. It features Te Tiriti meeting house.

Demographics
Whakapaku statistical area covers the western side of the Whangaroa Harbour and extends south to Otangaroa.

Whakapaku had a population of 744 at the 2018 New Zealand census, an increase of 36 people (5.1%) since the 2013 census, and an increase of 39 people (5.5%) since the 2006 census. There were 267 households, comprising 375 males and 375 females, giving a sex ratio of 1.0 males per female. The median age was 48.6 years (compared with 37.4 years nationally), with 156 people (21.0%) aged under 15 years, 81 (10.9%) aged 15 to 29, 342 (46.0%) aged 30 to 64, and 165 (22.2%) aged 65 or older.

Ethnicities were 76.2% European/Pākehā, 46.8% Māori, 2.4% Pacific peoples, and 1.6% Asian. People may identify with more than one ethnicity.

The percentage of people born overseas was 10.5, compared with 27.1% nationally.

Of those people who chose to answer the census's question about religious affiliation, 48.4% had no religion, 35.5% were Christian, 5.2% had Māori religious beliefs and 1.6% had other religions.

Of those at least 15 years old, 66 (11.2%) people had a bachelor's or higher degree, and 150 (25.5%) people had no formal qualifications. The median income was $22,300, compared with $31,800 nationally. 51 people (8.7%) earned over $70,000 compared to 17.2% nationally. The employment status of those at least 15 was that 216 (36.7%) people were employed full-time, 114 (19.4%) were part-time, and 27 (4.6%) were unemployed.

References

Far North District
Populated places in the Northland Region